43rd parallel may refer to:

43rd parallel north, a circle of latitude in the Northern Hemisphere
43rd parallel south, a circle of latitude in the Southern Hemisphere